Myosin phosphatase Rho-interacting protein is an enzyme that in humans is encoded by the MPRIP gene.

Interactions 

M-RIP has been shown to interact with RHOA.

References

Further reading